The  Kansas City Brigade season was the third season for the franchise, second in the American Conference's Central Division. After starting the season with 6 consecutive losses, the Brigade finished the season with a 3–13 record, however still the worst record in the American Conference.

Standings

Regular season schedule

Coaching

Final roster

Stats

Regular season

Week 1: vs Tampa Bay Storm

Week 2: at New York Dragons

Week 3
Bye Week

Week 4: vs. Grand Rapids Rampage

Week 5: vs. San Jose SaberCats

Week 6: at Georgia Force

Week 7: vs. Chicago Rush

Week 8: vs. Colorado Crush

Week 9: at Grand Rapids Rampage

Week 10: at Utah Blaze

Week 11: vs. Columbus Destroyers

Week 12: vs. Orlando Predators

Week 13: at Philadelphia Soul

Week 14: at Chicago Rush

Week 15: vs. Arizona Rattlers

Week 16: at Los Angeles Avengers

Week 17: at Colorado Crush

External links

Kansas City Brigade
Kansas City Command seasons